Red Earth 29 is an Indian reserve of the Red Earth Cree Nation in Saskatchewan. It is 75 kilometres east of Nipawin. In the 2016 Canadian Census, it recorded a population of 334 living in 61 of its 82 total private dwellings. In the same year, its Community Well-Being index was calculated at 40 of 100, compared to 58.4 for the average First Nations community and 77.5 for the average non-Indigenous community.

References

Indian reserves in Saskatchewan
Division No. 14, Saskatchewan